Chen Zude (Traditional: 陳祖德; Simplified: 陈祖德; Pinyin: Chén Zǔdé; February 19, 1944 – November 1, 2012) was a Chinese professional Go player. He was also the President of the Chinese Chess Association. He died of pancreatic cancer on November 1, 2012.

Go career
Zude was one of China's most decorated Go players. He was believed to be the founder of "Chinese fuseki". Although, according to Kato Masao, this pattern originated in Japan, Chen was the person who made this fuseki famous. Yasunaga Hajime, a Japanese pro-level amateur and teacher of many professionals, claims in his books that Chen saw the fuseki first when attending a study group and exhibition matches organized by Yasunaga and held in China.

Zude was President of the Zhongguo Qiyuan and also served in the Chinese Weiqi Association from 1992 - 2003 as chairman. He was awarded 9 dan in 1982.

Zude was the first Chinese Go player in the modern era to attain the rank of 9-dan.

Titles

See also
Chess in China

References

External links 
GoBase.org profile

1944 births
2012 deaths
Go players from Shanghai
Chess players from Shanghai
Deaths from cancer in the People's Republic of China
Deaths from pancreatic cancer